From 1920, the cab side of Great Western Railway (GWR) steam locomotives bore a letter on a coloured disc, which enabled staff to quickly assess the capabilities of locomotives without the need to check tables of data. The letter showed the power classification, and the coloured disc showed the weight restriction. This system continued after the GWR became the Western Region of British Railways.

History

On 1 July 1905 the Great Western Railway (GWR) introduced a system for denoting both the haulage capabilities and the weight restrictions which applied to their various classes of locomotive. Originally this was used only in record books, but from mid 1919 began to be shown on the locomotives themselves. The weight restriction was shown in the form of a coloured disc, and the power classification was denoted by a capital letter placed upon the disc. At first these were painted high on the cab side, but during World War II the blackout precautions meant that staff had to be careful using lights at night, so the disc and letter were moved downwards to a position just above the engine number plate, to make them easier to see.

When locomotives were loaned by other railways to the GWR during World War II, these were also allotted GWR power and weight classifications, so that GWR staff responsible for locomotive rostering could select the most suitable engine for the task without needing to learn an unfamiliar system.

The GWR was nationalised in 1948, becoming the Western Region of British Railways. In 1949, BR decided to adopt the London, Midland and Scottish Railway (LMS) system of power classification for all locomotives. Despite this, the use of a letter to denote power classification continued to be used on former GWR steam locomotives, as did the coloured disc for weight classification; both continued until the end of steam traction on the Western Region in 1965. Certain ex-LMS and BR Standard steam locomotives allocated to the Western Region were given GWR style route classification discs, usually without the power class letter. Some of these had the BR power class shown on the disc as a figure; for example, the Class 5 4-6-0 bore the figure "5" on a red disc. The coloured disc was also applied to some diesel locomotives allocated to the Western Region.

Description

Power classification
The letter represents the power of the locomotive, and is approximately proportional to the starting tractive effort, thus:

The "Special" classification was not shown on the "King" class, but in the case of no. 111 The Great Bear, "Special" was shown by a cross (+) on its red route restriction disc.

Locomotives loaned during World War II were given GWR power class letters, in order to avoid confusion with different systems used by the lending railway. For example, the Southern Railway (SR) also used letters, but with A representing the highest power; so when the SR loaned some S15 class 4-6-0s to the GWR, which were power class A on the SR, they were placed in power class D by the GWR; similarly, the London, Midland and Scottish Railway loaned some 2-8-0 locomotives of their power class 8F, which were given GWR power class E.

Also during World War II, it was decided that some classes of two-cylinder engines (including the 1000 (County), 4900 (Hall) and 6800 (Grange) classes) would be permitted to haul loads heavier than those specified in the working books for their power classification. These engines were distinguished by a white letter "X" painted above the number plate.

Weight restriction
The GWR system was divided into "red", "blue", "yellow" and "uncoloured" routes, according to the maximum axle load which the Civil Engineer would permit: for example, engines of axle load greater than 16 tons were not permitted onto "yellow" or "uncoloured" routes. In between these were "dotted red" and "dotted blue" routes, where overweight engines were permitted subject to speed restrictions. In addition, there were the "hatched red" routes, where any locomotive was permitted: the 6000 (King) class were barred from all except the "hatched red" routes. In August 1938 a summary of the GWR routes by colour was published:

Further routes were raised to this category after Nationalisation: Wolverhampton to  via ; and Bristol to Shrewsbury via .

Up to two coloured discs were painted on the cabside of GWR steam locomotives and some Western Region diesel locomotive classes, to show that the maximum axle load of the engine did not exceed a particular value, the absence of such circles meaning that no restrictions applied to the locomotive:

As with the power classifications, locomotives loaned to the GWR in World War II were given GWR weight restriction colours. For example, engines of LNER Class J25, which were Route Availability 3 on that line, were placed in GWR route restriction "Yellow".

There were occasional amendments in the light of operating experience; for example, the 5700 class (which had an axle loading of ) were found to have a low hammer blow, so caused less damage to the track than other engines of their axle load; accordingly, in 1950, they were reclassified from "Blue" to "Yellow".

Notes

References

 Power and Weight Classification
Locomotive classification systems